Posh is a 2006 Philippine television drama series broadcast by QTV. Directed by Joselito Altarejos, it stars Iwa Moto, Gian Carlos and Vaness del Moral. It premiered on June 24, 2006. The series concluded on December 23, 2006 with a total of 27 episodes.

Cast
 Iwa Moto
 Gian Carlos
 Vaness del Moral
 Vivo Ouano
 Rhea Nakpil
 Princess Violago
 PJ Valerio
 Ivan Carapiet
 Benjamin Alves
 Ashley Gruenberg
 Hayca Bunevacz
 Nikki Bacolod

References

External links
 

2006 Philippine television series debuts
2006 Philippine television series endings
Filipino-language television shows
Philippine teen drama television series
Q (TV network) original programming
Television series by Viva Television
Television shows set in the Philippines